Rhynchospora macrostachya, the tall horned beaksedge or tall beaksedge, is a plant in the sedge family, Cyperaceae. It is a perennial.

Conservation status in the United States
It is listed as threatened in Connecticut and Rhode Island. It is listed as rare in Indiana, and as endangered in Kentucky and Maine.

References

macrostachya
Flora of North America